Tapeinochilos is a group of plants in the  Costaceae described as a genus in 1869. It is native to Queensland, Papuasia, and the Indonesian Province of Maluku. Centered in Papua New Guinea, only three of the approximately 16 species occur outside of the country.

Species

Gallery

References

Costaceae
Zingiberales genera